Bronx Park Terminal was a terminal station on the demolished IRT Third Avenue Line in the Bedford Park neighborhood of the Bronx in New York City. The station was located adjacent to Bronx Park and the New York Botanical Garden at 198th Street between Webster Avenue and Southern Boulevard, in the approximate location of the modern Fordham Preparatory School. It was opened on May 21, 1902 and closed on November 14, 1951. The next southbound stop was Fordham Road – 190th Street.

History
The station was built as a one stop extension from Fordham Road – 190th Street (then called Pelham Avenue) to provide direct service to Bronx Park, particularly the New York Botanical Garden. It was located on a 2,200 x 50 foot tract of land on the western edge of the campus of St. John's College (now the Rose Hill campus of Fordham University), purchased from the college by the Manhattan Railway Company. This characteristic was shared with much of Bronx Park, particularly the Bronx Zoo and Botanical Garden which were also built on former Fordham property.

The station was the northern terminal for all Third Avenue Line trains until an extension north of Fordham Road on a separate right-of-way along Webster Avenue to Gun Hill Road was completed on October 4, 1920, which included a station at nearby 200th Street (now Bedford Park Boulevard). Due to reduced patronage at the station, beginning in 1948 no service ran to or from Bronx Park between 7 p.m. and 7 a.m. The station was closed entirely in 1951, and the entire structure was demolished by 1952. Afterwards, the right-of-way of the stub line was re-purchased by Fordham University for $55,000.

Station layout
The station had three tracks, the easternmost two of which were served by one island platform. The westernmost track had no platform and was used for storage. Following the extension of the line on Webster Avenue, Bronx Park became a stub-end station separate from the mainline. During this time, trains from Fordham Road either terminated at Bronx Park, or bypassed the station towards Gun Hill Road.

The station had a wide, covered wooden bridge across the tracks of the New York Central Railroad's New York and Harlem Railroad (now the Harlem Line of the Metro-North Railroad), permitting access to Fordham University and the New York Botanical Garden at Southern Blvd to the east, and to the Bedford Park neighborhood to the west.

References

External links

Post card view of the 3rd Ave El Bronx Park Terminal (Forgotten Bronx Transit)

IRT Third Avenue Line stations
Railway stations in the United States opened in 1902
Railway stations closed in 1951
Former elevated and subway stations in the Bronx
Bedford Park, Bronx